The western brown snake (Pseudonaja mengdeni) is commonly known as Mengden's brown snake, and alternatively, gwardar.

Pseudnaja mengdeni is endemic to Australia. It is highly variable in colour and patterns and is a highly dangerous elapid whose bite can cause severe symptoms resulting in death. It is one of the three species originally classified as Pseudonaja nuchalis along with P. aspidorhyncha, and P. nuchalis.

Taxonomy 

Previously the western brown snake was considered a 'morph' form of Pseudonaja nuchalis, recent genetic studies have proven it to be genetically unique.

It is estimated that Pseudonaja nuchalis could include in excess of 10 different species.  Although currently there have been 8 species chromosomeally identified species these include:  P. aspidorhyncha, P. mengdeni,  P. imperator, P. acutirostris, P. gowi, P. carinata, P. kellyi and P. nuchalis.

Description
Pseudonaja mengdeni grows up to a total length of 2m with an average length 1.2m It has slender body and narrow head. Mengden's brown snake is highly variable in colour and patterns, ranging from light brown to almost black. However it has two distinct forms ‘Orange with black head’ or ‘Pale head, grey nape’ The underside along the belly is often cream, yellow, orange, or grey in colouration, frequently consisting of dark orange or grey blotches.

Scales on the head often form a black V or W pattern. Western brown snakes can be confused with the Eastern brown snake which has a pink mouth lining, the Northern brown snake has a purplish/blue-black mouth lining. P. mengdeni has a distinctive large strap-like scale around the front of the snout. To accurately identify this species the scales around the mid-body and along the lips need to be counted. 180-230 ventral scales, 45-70 subcaudals with a divided anal scale and 17 or 19 rows of smooth mid-body scales. However this must only be done by an experienced herpetologist, as a scratch from the fangs can still be fatal from P. mengdeni.

Confusion between the species is largely due to the possible hybridisation between the Pseudonaja species.

The western brown snake is often confused with other Pseudonaja spp. (brown snakes) and also Aspidites melanocephalus (black headed python).

Distribution and habitat 
Found from the coast of Western Australia through central Australia to the north-west of New South Wales and western Queensland. The species distribution is poorly defined within its northern limits however it is absent from wetter areas of eastern Australia and south-western Western Australia.

Pseudonaja mengdeni is practically found throughout all dry to arid areas including, woodlands, Boree woodlands, sandhill woodlands, mallee woodlands, spinifex deserts, spinifex-covered dunefields, sandplains, stony plains, croplands, grasslands and temperate sclerophyll forests. The Western brown snake often found within fallen timber, dead trees, shrubs, native grasses and ground cavities.

Diet 

Pseudonaja mengdeni preys upon small reptiles, mammals, other snakes, ground nesting birds and bird eggs.

Reproduction 

Pseudonaja mengdeni is oviparous and can lay up to in excess of 12 eggs per clutch.

Venom 

Pseudonaja mengdeni has highly dangerous venom neurotoxic and haemotoxic and can cause severe symptoms resulting in death. Mengden's brown snake is considered dangerously venomous.

Antivenom used in case of envenoming is the brown snake Antivenom If bitten first aid must be applied and medical attention sought.

Behaviour 

Pseudonaja mengdeni will rear their fore-body into an S-shape when threatened lifting their head off the ground and open their mouth. Is also a terrestrial species that is diurnal however it can be active on warm nights

References

mengdeni
Snakes of Australia
Reptiles described in 1985